Parlin may refer to:

Parlin, Mogilno County, in Kuyavian-Pomeranian Voivodeship (north-central Poland)
Parlin, Świecie County, in Kuyavian-Pomeranian Voivodeship (north-central Poland)
Parlin, Płońsk County, in Masovian Voivodeship (east-central Poland)
Parlin, Żuromin County, in Masovian Voivodeship (east-central Poland)
Parlin, New Jersey, in the United States

People with the surname
Charles Coolidge Parlin (1872–1942), American manager and pioneer of market research
Bob Parlin, American educator and LGBTQ activist